Thomas Edward Crowther (born May 1970) is a practising British barrister who served as a Circuit Judge from 2013 to 2018. He was assigned to the Wales Circuit on 24 July 2013 and resigned from the circuit bench on 5 December 2018 to return to legal practice.

Career 

Crowther qualified B.Sc.(Hons), B.A.(Hons) from Exeter University. He became a barrister in 1993 and  Queen's Counsel in 2013. Crowther was a founder member of Apex Chambers in 2007 and head of chambers in 2012–13.

He was a fee-paid (part time) judge of the Asylum and Immigration Tribunal (later the First-Tier Tribunal, Immigration and Asylum Chamber) 2006–2013, a Recorder 2009–2013, a Circuit Judge 2013–2018, and an associate Judge of the Sovereign Bases of Akrotiri and Dhekelia 2015–2020.

Following his return to practice, Crowther joined Serjeants' Inn Chambers, London, in February 2019.

In June 2019, he was appointed as Chair of the Independent Inquiry into Telford Child Sexual Exploitation. The Inquiry's Report was published in four volumes in July 2022.

He is a panel chair for the  Council of the Inns of Court Disciplinary Pool.

Note-taking ban 
During proceedings at Cardiff Crown Court on 7 and 8 April 2014 Crowther directed that no member of the public could make notes of the proceedings without his permission and twice ruled that the claimant in the case in question could not make notes. On spotting someone taking notes in the public gallery Crowther stated:
"[H]enceforth any taking of notes without permission will be regarded as a contempt of court and will be dealt with as such."
When a judicial review of Crowther's rulings were considered at the High Court a judge there ruled "those who attend public court hearings should be free to make notes of what occurs". That there could be exceptions such as where note taking was done for a wrongful purpose; for example to brief a witness who is not in court was noted. The High Court judged there had been a mistaken understanding that notes should never be taken unless permission was first sought from and granted by the court; and that the ruling had no bearing on the outcome of the proceedings to which it related.

References

External links 

 Tom Crowther Twitter Account (Caution unverified)

21st-century English judges
Living people
1970 births
Members of the Inner Temple
British King's Counsel